Gully Creek is a  long 1st order tributary to the Fisher River in Surry County, North Carolina.

Course
Gully Creek rises in a spring on the divide of West Fork Chestnut Creek about 0.5 miles south of Low Gap, Virginia.  From the spring at the stateline of Virginia, Gully Creek then flows south into Surry County, North Carolina and then southeast to join the Fisher River about 0.5 miles north of Lowgap.

Watershed
Gully Creek drains  of area, receives about 49.1 in/year of precipitation, has a wetness index of 272.01, and is about 67% forested.

See also
List of rivers of North Carolina

References

Rivers of North Carolina
Rivers of Virginia
Rivers of Surry County, North Carolina
Rivers of Grayson County, Virginia